George Alexander Trebek  (July 22, 1940 – November 8, 2020) was a Canadian-American game show host and television personality. He is best known for hosting the syndicated general knowledge quiz game show Jeopardy! for 37 seasons from its revival in 1984 until his death in 2020. Trebek also hosted a number of other game shows, including The Wizard of Odds, Double Dare, High Rollers, Battlestars, Classic Concentration, and To Tell the Truth. He also made appearances, usually as himself, in numerous films and television series.

A native of Canada, Trebek became a naturalized U.S. citizen in 1998. He received the Daytime Emmy Award for Outstanding Game Show Host eight times for his work on Jeopardy! He died on November 8, 2020 at the age of 80, after a 20-month battle with stage IV pancreatic cancer. Trebek had been contracted to host Jeopardy! until 2022.

Early life
Trebek was born on July 22, 1940, in Sudbury, Ontario, Canada, the son of George Edward Trebek (born Terebeychuk), a chef who had emigrated from Ukraine as a child, and Lucille Marie Lagacé (April 14, 1921 – 2016), a Franco-Ontarian. Trebek had roots in Renfrew County, Ontario, where his maternal grandmother was born in Mount St. Patrick near Renfrew. He grew up in a bilingual French-English household. Trebek was almost expelled from the boarding school his parents sent him to. Shortly after, he attended a military college but dropped out when he was asked to cut his hair. Trebek's first job at age 13 was as a bellhop at the hotel where his father worked as a chef. Trebek attended Sudbury High School (now Sudbury Secondary School) and then attended the University of Ottawa. Trebek graduated from the University of Ottawa with a degree in philosophy in 1961. While a university student, he was a member of the English Debating Society. At the time, he was interested in a broadcast news career.

Broadcasting career

CBC
Before completing his degree, Trebek began his career in 1961 working for the Canadian Broadcasting Corporation. According to Trebek, "I went to school in the mornings and worked at nights; I did everything, at one time replacing every announcer in every possible job." He would eventually read the CBC national radio news and cover a wide range of special events for CBC Radio and CBC Television, including curling and horse racing.

Trebek's first hosting job was on a Canadian music program called Music Hop in 1963. In 1966, he hosted a high school quiz show called Reach for the Top. From 1967 to 1970, he was a host for the CBC, introducing classical music programs including performances by Glenn Gould. For one or two seasons he hosted a weekly skating program. Starting on April 1, 1969, Trebek also hosted Strategy, a weekday afternoon game show. From 1971 until the end of 1972, Trebek hosted I'm Here Til 9, the local morning drive radio show on CBC Toronto.

In 1971, Trebek was one of several to have been shortlisted to succeed Ward Cornell as host of Hockey Night in Canada. Although Trebek was the preferred choice of executive producer Ralph Mellanby, based on his audition and other CBC roles, Mellanby stated in 2020 that he ultimately chose Dave Hodge instead, because his boss did not want someone with a mustache to host Hockey Night.

Game shows

In 1973, Trebek moved to the United States and worked for NBC as host of a new game show, The Wizard of Odds. A year later Trebek hosted the popular Merrill Heatter-Bob Quigley game show High Rollers, which had two incarnations on NBC (1974–76 and 1978–80) and an accompanying syndicated season (1975–76). In between stints as host of High Rollers, Trebek hosted the short-lived CBS game show Double Dare (not to be confused with the 1986 Nickelodeon game show of the same name). Double Dare turned out to be his only game show with the CBS network (he returned there in 1994 to host the Pillsbury Bake-Off until 1998), and the first show he hosted for what was then Mark Goodson-Bill Todman Productions, as well as the second season of the syndicated series The $128,000 Question, which was recorded in Toronto.

Since the second incarnation of High Rollers premiered while The $128,000 Question was still airing and taping episodes, Trebek became one of two hosts to emcee shows in both the United States and Canada, joining Jim Perry, who was hosting Definition and Headline Hunters in Canada and Card Sharks, which coincidentally premiered the same day as High Rollers in 1978 in the United States. Trebek's francophone side was put on display in 1978, in a special bilingual edition of Reach for the Top and its Radio-Canada equivalent, Génies en herbe. In this show, Trebek alternated smoothly between French and English throughout.

Like other hosts of the day, Trebek made several guest appearances as a panelist or player on other shows. One of his guest appearances was on a special week of NBC's Card Sharks in 1980. He and several other game show hosts (Allen Ludden, Bill Cullen, Wink Martindale, Jack Clark, Tom Kennedy, Gene Rayburn, and Jim Lange) competed in a week-long round-robin tournament for charity. Trebek won the tournament, defeating Cullen in the finals. Trebek also appeared as a celebrity teammate on the NBC game show The Magnificent Marble Machine in 1975, and the Tom Kennedy-hosted NBC word game To Say the Least in 1978. Both of those shows were produced by Merrill Heatter-Bob Quigley Productions, which also produced High Rollers, the show Trebek was hosting during both of those guest appearances. Trebek also was a contestant on Celebrity Bowling in 1976, teamed with Jim McKrell. The duo won their match against Dick Gautier and Scatman Crothers.

After High Rollers was cancelled in 1980, Trebek moved on to Battlestars for NBC. The series debuted in October 1981 and was cancelled in April 1982 after only six months on the air. In September 1981 Trebek took the helm of the syndicated Pitfall, which taped in Vancouver and forced him to commute, as he had done while hosting High Rollers and The $128,000 Question in 1978. Pitfall was cancelled after its production company, Catalena Productions, went bankrupt. As a result, he was never paid for that series. After both series ended, Trebek hosted a revival of Battlestars called The New Battlestars that ended after thirteen weeks, then shot a series of pilots for other series for producer Merrill Heatter, for whom he had worked hosting High Rollers and Battlestars, and Merv Griffin. The Heatter pilots were Malcolm, an NBC-ordered pilot featuring Trebek with an animated character as his co-host, and Lucky Numbers, an attempt at a revival of High Rollers that failed to sell. For Griffin, (who was ultimately encouraged to hire Trebek by Lucille Ball) he shot two pilots for a revival of Jeopardy! when original host Art Fleming (a friend of Trebek's) declined to return to the role owing to creative differences. This revival sold; Trebek began hosting it in 1984 and remained the host until his death. His final episode hosting Jeopardy! was to air on Christmas Day 2020; however, Sony announced on November 23, 2020, that the air dates of Trebek's final week would be postponed, with episodes scheduled for the week of December 21–25 being postponed to January 4–8, 2021 due to the delay caused by the cancellation of most November production dates and pre-emptions caused by holiday week specials and shorts.

Following Trebek's death, a series of guest hosts filled in for Trebek for the remainder of season 37 of Jeopardy! (his final season). On July 27, 2022, it was announced that Mayim Bialik and Ken Jennings will succeed Trebek as the permanent hosts of Jeopardy! after alternating in multi-week stints for the remainder of the show's 38th season after Mike Richards (the show's then executive producer who briefly succeeded Trebek as host of the program) was let go after taping a week's worth of episodes after various controversies came to light.

In 1987, while still hosting Jeopardy!, Trebek returned to daytime television as host of NBC's Classic Concentration, his second show for Mark Goodson. He hosted both shows simultaneously until September 20, 1991, when Classic Concentration aired its final first-run episode (NBC would air repeats until 1993). In 1991, Trebek made broadcast history by becoming the first person to host three American game shows at the same time, earning this distinction on February 4, 1991, when he took over from Lynn Swann as host of NBC's To Tell the Truth for Goodson-Todman, which he hosted until the end of the series' run on May 31, 1991.

In 1994, Trebek returned to the CBS network for the first time since hosting Double Dare to host the Pillsbury Bake-Off, which he hosted until 1998. Trebek and Pat Sajak, host of Wheel of Fortune, traded places on April Fools' Day 1997. Pat Sajak hosted Jeopardy! and Trebek hosted Wheel of Fortune with Sajak's wife, Lesly, as Trebek's co-host. Sajak and Wheel of Fortune co-host Vanna White played contestants at the wheel, with winnings going toward charities. Trebek appeared on Celebrity Poker Showdown in 2005 and came in second place in his qualifying game, losing to Cheryl Hines.

On June 24, 2018, Trebek returned as a panelist on the ABC revival of To Tell the Truth.  Trebek hosted a Jeopardy! primetime special event titled The Greatest of All Time on ABC in January 2020, pitting the highest money winners in the show's history, Brad Rutter, Ken Jennings, and James Holzhauer, against each other.

Other appearances
Trebek made multiple guest appearances on other television shows, ranging from Jimmy Kimmel Live! in 2008 and 2011 to The Colbert Report series-finale. In August 1995 in a return to his broadcast-news roots, Trebek filled in for Charles Gibson for a week on Good Morning America. Trebek was a guest star in season 3 of The X-Files, playing one of two "Men in Black" (human agents charged with the supervision of extraterrestrial lifeforms on Earth, hiding their existence from other humans) opposite Jesse Ventura, in the episode "Jose Chung's From Outer Space", which first aired on April 12, 1996. On June 13, 2014, Guinness World Records presented Trebek with the world record for most episodes of a game show hosted, with 6,829 episodes at the time. Trebek also appeared in multiple television commercials.

On October 1, 2018, Trebek moderated the only debate in the Pennsylvania governor's race, between Democrat Tom Wolf and Republican Scott Wagner. According to news outlets, he wanted to change the flow of the debate to be more conversational instead of the more traditional format. He dominated the debate and talked for 41% of it, often talking about himself without giving candidates time to discuss their stances on political issues. He also made remarks regarding the sexual abuse scandals in the Catholic Church. Trebek later apologized for his performance, stating that he was "naive" and "misunderstood" the role of a moderator. "I offer my sincere apologies to the people of Pennsylvania, a state I dearly love," he said.

Trebek was interviewed by Michael Strahan for an ABC special chronicling Jeopardy! and his career (produced to promote Jeopardy! The Greatest of All Time), which aired January 2, 2020.

On October 6, 2020, Trebek made a cameo appearance in the 2020 NHL Entry Draft, announcing the Ottawa Senators' third-overall draft pick, Tim Stützle, in the style of a Jeopardy! question.

Personal life

Trebek married broadcaster Elaine Callei in 1974. The couple had no children, although Trebek adopted Callei's daughter Nicky; they divorced in 1981. In 1990, he married Jean Currivan, a real estate project manager from New York. They had two children, Matthew and Emily.

In 1996, Trebek ran the Olympic torch in Jacksonville, Florida, through a leg of its journey to Atlanta. He became a naturalized citizen of the United States in 1998.

On January 30, 2004, Trebek escaped major injury after falling asleep behind the wheel of his pickup truck while driving alone on a rural road in the Central Coast town of Templeton, California, returning from a family home in Lake Nacimiento. The truck sideswiped a string of mailboxes, flew 45 feet over an embankment, and came to rest against a utility pole in a ditch. Trebek was not cited for the accident and returned to work taping Jeopardy! four days later.

Trebek owned and managed a 700-acre (283 ha) ranch near Paso Robles in Creston, California, known as Creston Farms, where he bred and trained thoroughbred racehorses. His colt Reba's Gold is the stakes-winning son of Slew o' Gold. Trebek sold the operation in 2008 and the property is now an event center called Windfall Farms.

In a 2018 interview with Vulture, Trebek said he was a political moderate and registered independent, neither conservative nor liberal, with some libertarian leanings. Trebek stated he believed in God as a Christian. During a 2018 gubernatorial debate, he said he was raised Catholic during his childhood and adolescence.

Health
On December 10, 2007, Trebek experienced a minor heart attack at his home, but returned to work as scheduled in January 2008. Early in the morning on July 26, 2011, he injured an Achilles tendon while chasing a burglar who had entered his San Francisco hotel room, requiring six weeks in a cast. Trebek experienced another mild heart attack on June 23, 2012, but was able to return to work the following month.

On December 15, 2017, over the winter break of Jeopardy! taping, Trebek was admitted to Cedars-Sinai Medical Center after reportedly experiencing complications from a fall in October of that year. The incident resulted in a subdural hematoma. Trebek underwent surgery to remove blood clots from his brain the following day. On January 4, 2018, the verified Twitter account of Jeopardy! announced that Trebek had been suffering from the fall. Trebek required a short medical leave and returned to regular hosting duty in mid-January 2018.

In 2018, while being interviewed by Harvey Levin on Fox News, Trebek floated the idea of retirement, saying the odds of his leaving Jeopardy! in 2020 were 50/50 "and a little less". He added that he might continue if he is "not making too many mistakes" but would make an "intelligent decision" as to when he should give up the emcee role. In October that year, he signed a new contract to continue as host through 2022, stating in January 2019 that although he was beginning to slow down due to his age, the show's work schedule, consisting of 46 taping sessions each year, was still manageable.

Pancreatic cancer and death
On March 6, 2019, Trebek announced that he had been diagnosed with stage IV pancreatic cancer. He had been experiencing a persistent stomach ache before the diagnosis but did not recognize it as a symptom of the disease. In a prepared video announcement of the diagnosis, Trebek noted that his prognosis was poor but said that he would aggressively fight the cancer in hopes of beating the odds and would continue hosting Jeopardy! for as long as he was able, joking that his contract obligated him to do so for three more years. Trebek updated the situation in May 2019, stating that he was responding exceptionally well to treatment and that some of the tumors had shrunk to half their previously observed size; he credited the prayers and well wishes of his fans for the better-than-usual results and planned to undergo several more rounds of chemotherapy. Trebek finished that round of chemotherapy treatments in time to resume taping of the show in August 2019. Follow-up immunotherapy was ineffective, and Trebek resumed chemotherapy in September.

On October4, 2019, in an interview with CTV's Chief Anchor and Senior Editor Lisa LaFlamme, Trebek said: "I'm not afraid of dying" and "I've lived a good life, a full life, and I'm nearing the end of that life... [I]f it happens, why should I be afraid [of] that?" In the same interview, Trebek noted that sores in his mouth, a side effect from the chemotherapy, were interfering with his ability to speak, noting that "there will come a point when they (fans and producers) will no longer be able to say, 'It's okay.'" On November 11, 2019, during the Final Jeopardy! round, a player named Dhruv Gaur's response stated, "What is We ♡ you, Alex!", which caused Trebek to become emotional. Hours later, #WeLoveYouAlex was trending on Twitter. In a December 2019 interview with ABC News, Trebek stated that he would begin looking at experimental treatments and chemotherapies and that despite periods of severe pain and depression, he was still in good enough physical condition to handle construction projects. Trebek also stated that he had already prepared an on-air farewell statement before his cancer diagnosis.

In March 2020, Trebek announced he had survived one year of cancer treatment (noting that his prognosis had given him only an 18% chance to survive that long) and that, though the chemotherapy treatments were often worse than the cancer symptoms themselves, he was confident that he would survive another year, saying that ending treatment would be a "betrayal" to his family, supporters, and to the God in whom he has faith. As a precautionary measure, Jeopardy! initially taped episodes without a studio audience, as protection from the COVID-19 pandemic; Trebek, because of both his age and his condition, was particularly at risk of death from the particular variant of SARS-CoV-2 circulating. Soon afterward, production of the show was suspended altogether. The show resumed taping in August, in time for the season 37 premiere.

On July 16, 2020, Trebek gave an update regarding his cancer.  He said that, while he still felt fatigued, the chemotherapy was "paying off." He also stated that he was looking forward to taping again. On July 21, 2020, he published his memoir The Answer Is...: Reflections on My Life.

Trebek underwent surgery related to his cancer treatment in October. He returned to the show two weeks after the surgery, but was unable to handle his full workload because of pain from the surgery and had to split his usual five-episode taping session over two days; these five episodes would be his last. He taped his final episode on October 29, 2020. Trebek died at his home in Los Angeles on November8, 2020, at the age of 80, after 20 months fighting pancreatic cancer. It was the same disease that affected his predecessor and the original host of Jeopardy! Art Fleming, who died twenty-five years earlier. His remains were cremated, and given to his wife. Trebek's estate was liquidated in an estate sale in April 2022 as his daughter prepared to sell his home in Studio City.

Posthumous recognition
Not long after his death, Jeopardy! contestant Ken Jennings, Canadian Prime Minister Justin Trudeau, and Wheel of Fortune hosts Pat Sajak and Vanna White were among those who paid tribute.

On the November 9, 2020 episode of Jeopardy!, as a tribute to Trebek, then-executive producer of both Jeopardy! and Wheel of Fortune Mike Richards opened the show with this statement:

The lights on the set then dimmed blue in remembrance.

After each posthumous episode in season 37, the title card read, "Dedicated to Alex Trebek. Forever in our hearts. Always our inspiration."

On the first anniversary of his death, which was also the day that the first episode Ken Jennings hosted in season 38 was aired, a different title card read, "Alex Trebek, July 22, 1940 – November 8, 2020. You are missed every day."

Since his death, various television networks aired their own tributes to Trebek such as MeTV (which played "What Is... Cliff Clavin?" and "Mama on Jeopardy!", two episodes of the classic 1980s sitcoms Cheers and Mama's Family respectively in which Jeopardy! was a plot device), Buzzr (which aired episodes of shows Trebek guest starred in such as Card Sharks or hosted such as Classic Concentration and To Tell the Truth in the Fremantle library) and Game Show Network (which aired a Jeopardy! marathon).

Trebek's final episode of Jeopardy! aired on January 8, 2021, concluding with a tribute to Trebek.

In 2021, the Jeopardy! stage was renamed "The Alex Trebek Stage", with his family present at the dedication.

Philanthropy and activism

Trebek was a longtime philanthropist and activist. He was active with multiple charities, including World Vision Canada and United Service Organizations. For World Vision, Trebek travelled to many developing countries with World Vision projects, taping reports on the group's efforts on behalf of children around the world. Trebek and the Jeopardy! crew became involved with the United Service Organizations in 1995, appearing on several military bases throughout the world, both in an attempt to find contestants and as a morale booster for the troops. He donated 74 acres (30 hectares) of open land in the Hollywood Hills to the Santa Monica Mountains Conservancy in 1998. He was later awarded one of the American Foundation for the Blind's six yearly Access Awards for his role in accommodating Jeopardy! champion Eddie Timanus. Trebek hosted the annual The Great Canadian Geography Challenge in Canada. He hosted the National Geographic Bee in the United States for 25 years, stepping down in 2013. Trebek served on the advisory board of U.S. English, an organization that supports making English the official language of the United States.

In 2016, Trebek donated $5 million to the University of Ottawa to fund the Alex Trebek Forum for Dialogue, the objective of which is "to expose students to a wide range of diverse views, through speeches, public panels, events and lectures by University of Ottawa researchers, senior government officials and guests speakers from around the world." Trebek's gifts to the university, which at the time totaled $7.5 million, also fund a Distinguished Speaker Series, which has included a presentation by Nobel laureate Leymah Gbowee, introduced by Trebek. In 2017, Trebek funded the Alex Trebek Leadership Award at the University of Ottawa, an annual $10,000 award to a summa cum laude graduate who has also demonstrated community leadership. By October 2020, Trebek's contributions to the University of Ottawa totalled around $10 million.

In March 2020, Trebek donated $100,000 to Hope of the Valley Rescue Mission, a homeless shelter in Los Angeles.

Trebek owned his own wardrobe, consisting of dozens of outfits and hundreds of neckties. In February 2021, Trebek's son Matthew donated the wardrobe to The Doe Fund, in keeping with a statement Trebek had made on his last day of taping.

Awards and honours

In 1997, Trebek was awarded the honorary degree of Doctor of the university (D.Univ) from the University of Ottawa. In addition to awards for Jeopardy!, Trebek received a great deal of recognition. He received a star on Canada's Walk of Fame in Toronto. He was awarded eight Outstanding Game Show Host Emmy Awards (1989, 1990, 2003, 2006, 2008, 2019, 2020, and 2021) and a star on the Hollywood Walk of Fame (located at 6501 Hollywood Boulevard, near those for Ann-Margret and Vincent Price).

On November 4, 2010, Trebek received the Royal Canadian Geographical Society's gold medal for his contribution to geographic education and the popular study of geography. Previous recipients of this award include the author and anthropologist Wade Davis (2009), Peter Gzowski (1997), and Mary May Simon (1998). In 2016, Trebek was named the Honorary President of the Royal Canadian Geographical Society; in that capacity, he was present at the opening of the RCGS's new headquarters in 2018.

In 2011, it was announced that Trebek would be one of the recipients of the Lifetime Achievement Award at the Daytime Emmy Awards. That same year Trebek received an Honorary Doctorate from Fordham University. Since June 13, 2014, Trebek has held a Guinness World Record for "the most gameshow episodes hosted by the same presenter (same program)" for having hosted 6,829 episodes of Jeopardy!, overtaking previous record holder Bob Barker.
On May 4, 2015, Trebek's alma mater, the University of Ottawa, named its alumni hall in his honour, as a benefactor to the university.

In May 2016, Trebek was given the Key to the City by the City of Ottawa. On June 30, 2017, he was named an Officer of the Order of Canada by then-Governor General David Johnston for "his iconic achievements in television and for his promotion of learning, notably as a champion for geographical literacy." On June 28, 2019, the Daughters of the American Revolution awarded the 2019 Americanism Award to Trebek.

On January 7, 2020, Trebek was awarded along with his wife Jean, the Fordham Founder's Award at Fordham University.

In December 2019, Trebek was named the winner of the Academy of Canadian Cinema and Television's Icon Award for the 8th Canadian Screen Awards in 2020. Although the ceremony was cancelled due to the COVID-19 pandemic in Canada, the award was presented to Trebek in a recorded acceptance speech, which the academy released to social media platforms in January 2021 to coincide with the broadcast of Trebek's last episode of Jeopardy!

In July 2021, the Royal Canadian Geographical Society and the National Geographical Society announced a grant program named The Trebek Initiative whose goal is to promote emerging Canadian explorers, scientists, educators and photographers.

In August, artist Kevin Ledo created a mural memorializing Trebek on the outer wall of Sudbury Secondary School, where Trebek had attended high school, as part of the Up Here Festival.

On August 19, 2021, prior to the start of Jeopardy! season 38 taping, Sony Pictures Studios sound stage Studio 10 was officially renamed as "The Alex Trebek stage".

Television and film appearances

Shows hosted
 1963–1964: Music Hop (CBC)
 1964: Vacation Time – co-host (CBC)
 1966–1970: CBC Championship Curling – announcer (CBC)
 1966–1973: Reach for the Top (CBC)
 1969: Barris & Company – co-host/announcer (pilot) (CBC)
 1969: Strategy (CBC)
 1971: Pick and Choose (CBC) 
 1972: Outside/Inside (CBC) 
 1973: TGIF – announcer (CBC) 
 1973: The Wizard of Odds (NBC)
 1974–1976, 1978–1980: High Rollers (NBC)
 1976–1977: Double Dare (CBS)
 1976–1980: Stars on Ice (CTV)
 1977–1978: The $128,000 Question
 1980–1981: Wall $treet
 1981–1982: Pitfall
 1981–1983: Battlestars
 1983: Malcolm (pilot)
 1983: Starcade (pilot)
 1984–2021: Jeopardy!
 1985: Lucky Numbers (pilot)
 1987: Second Guess (unsold pilot)
 1987: VTV-Value Television – co-host with Meredith MacRae
 1987–1991: Classic Concentration
 1989–2013: The National Geographic Bee national finals
 1990: Super Jeopardy!
 1991: To Tell the Truth (1990–1991) – from February to May 1991
 1993: The Red Badge of Courage/Heart of Courage – Canadian-produced show highlighting brave individuals
 1996–1998: The Pillsbury Bake-Off
 1997: Wheel of Fortune – April Fools' Day episode (also a substitute host in August 1980)
 1999: Live from the Hollywood Bowl – annual live broadcast
 2017: Game Changers – host and executive producer
 2020: Jeopardy! The Greatest of All Time

Acting
 1987: Mama's Family – as himself, the host of Jeopardy! (episode 4.19 – "Mama on Jeopardy!")
 1988: For Keeps – as himself, the host of Jeopardy!
 1988: Rain Man – as himself, the host of Jeopardy!
 1990: Cheers – as himself, the host of Jeopardy! (episode 8.14 – "What Is... Cliff Clavin?")
 1990: Predator 2 – as himself, the host of Jeopardy! (voice)
 1990: The Earth Day Special – as himself, the host of Jeopardy!
 1991: WrestleMania VII – as himself, a ring announcer and interviewer
 1992: The Golden Girls – as himself, the host of Jeopardy! (episode 7.16 – "Questions and Answers")
 1992: White Men Can't Jump – as himself, the host of Jeopardy!
 1993: Short Cuts – as himself, the host of Jeopardy!
 1993: Groundhog Day – as himself, the host of Jeopardy! show #1656
 1993: The Larry Sanders Show – as himself, the minister who marries Hank Kingsley (episode 2.15 – "Hank's Wedding")
 1993: Rugrats – as Alan Quebec, the host of "Super Stumpers" (episode 2.37 – "Game Show Didi")
 1995: The Nanny – as himself, the host of Jeopardy! (episode 3.2 – "Franny and the Professor")
 1995: Beverly Hills, 90210 – as himself, the host of Jeopardy!
 1995: Blossom – as himself, the host of Jeopardy! (episode 5.14 – "Who's Not on First")
 1995: Jury Duty – as himself, the host of Jeopardy!
 1996: The X-Files – as a Man in Black who Agent Mulder thought looked "incredibly" like himself (episode: "Jose Chung's From Outer Space")
 1996: Seinfeld – as himself, the host of Jeopardy! (episode 8.9 – "The Abstinence")
 1996: The Magic School Bus – Announcer (voice) (episode 2.6 – "Shows and Tells")
 1996: Ellen's Energy Adventure – as himself, the host of Jeopardy!
 1997: Ned and Stacey – as himself, the host of Jeopardy!
 1997: The Simpsons – as himself, the host of Jeopardy! in "Miracle on Evergreen Terrace" (Voice)
 1998: Baywatch – as himself, the host of Jeopardy! (episode 9.8 – "Swept Away")
 1998: The Weird Al Show – as himself, the host of Jeopardy! (voice)
 1998: Mafia! – himself, riding on a parade float
 2000: Finding Forrester – as himself, the host of Jeopardy!
 2000: Charlie's Angels – as himself, the host of Jeopardy!
 2000: Saturday Night Live – himself
 2000: Arthur – as Alex Lebek, the host of Riddle Quest
 2000: Pepper Ann – as himself (2 episodes)
 2002: Saturday Night Live – himself
 2006: Family Guy – as himself, the host of Jeopardy! in "I Take Thee Quagmire" (voice)
 2007: The Bucket List – as himself, the host of Jeopardy! (voice)
 2010: How I Met Your Mother – himself in "False Positive"
 2012: The Simpsons – as himself, the host of Jeopardy! in "Penny-Wiseguys" (Voice)
 2013: How I Met Your Mother – himself in "P.S. I Love You"
 2013: Delta Air Lines – as himself, answering a Jeopardy-like question in the final segment of Delta's Holiday-themed safety video.
 2014: Hot in Cleveland – as himself and Park Ranger Alex Trebek
 2014: Delta Air Lines – as himself, seen raising hand after being asked if the passengers have any questions toward the end of a Delta safety video.
 2014: The Colbert Report (series finale) – as himself, "the man who knows all the answers", in Santa's sleigh.
 2015: The Amazing Race Canada 3 – as himself/Sudbury Pit Stop greeter
 2018: Orange Is the New Black – as himself
 2018: RuPaul's Drag Race – as himself
 2020: Last Week Tonight with John Oliver  – as himself
 2020: 2020 NHL Entry Draft  – as himself
 2020: Scooby-Doo and Guess Who? - as himself, the host of Jeopardy! in "Total Jeopardy" (voice, posthumous release)
 2021: Free Guy – as himself, the host of Jeopardy! (final film role, posthumous)

References

External links

 
 
 
 

1940 births
2020 deaths
American game show hosts
American horse racing announcers
American male voice actors
American memoirists
American people of French-Canadian descent
American people of Ukrainian descent
American racehorse owners and breeders
American television sports announcers
Canadian emigrants to the United States
Canadian game show hosts
Canadian horse racing announcers
Canadian male voice actors
Canadian memoirists
Canadian people of Ukrainian descent
Canadian radio news anchors
CBC Radio hosts
CBC Television people
Curling broadcasters
Daytime Emmy Award for Outstanding Game Show Host winners
Daytime Emmy Award winners
Deaths from cancer in California
Deaths from pancreatic cancer
Franco-Ontarian people
Jeopardy!
Naturalized citizens of the United States
Officers of the Order of Canada
People from Greater Sudbury
People from Ottawa
Royal Military College of Canada alumni
University of Ottawa alumni